Castle Bernard railway station was on the West Cork Railway in County Cork, Ireland.

History

The station opened on 12 June 1866 as a private station for The 3rd Earl of Bandon who lived at Castle Bernard, a country house near Bandon. It was opened to public services from 1 February 1874.

Regular passenger services were withdrawn on 1 April 1891.

Routes

Further reading

References

Disused railway stations in County Cork
Railway stations opened in 1866
Railway stations closed in 1891
1866 establishments in Ireland
Railway stations in the Republic of Ireland opened in the 19th century